Volzhsk (Julser-Ola) is a town in the Mari El Republic, Russia, located near the Mari El–Tatarstan border and a part of the Kazan metropolitan area. Population:

Administrative and municipal status
Within the framework of administrative divisions, Volzhsk serves as the administrative center of Volzhsky District, even though it is not a part of it. As an administrative division, it is incorporated separately as the town of republic significance of Volzhsk—an administrative unit with the status equal to that of the districts. As a municipal division, the town of republic significance of Volzhsk is incorporated as Volzhsk Urban Okrug.

References

Notes

Sources



Cities and towns in Mari El